Carol T. Kulik is a Research Professor of Human Resource Management and a senior researcher within the Centre for Workplace Excellence.

Kulik studied industrial-organizational psychology at the University of Illinois at Urbana–Champaign in the United States, and completed a doctorate in business administration, focusing on organizational behavior at the same institution. She taught at UIUC before moving to Arizona State University, then moved to Australia for a position at the University of Melbourne. Kulik later joined the University of South Australia Business School faculty as a research professor of human resource management. Over the course of her career, Kulik has been elected to fellowship of the Society for Industrial and Organizational Psychology, the Academy of Management, and the Academy of the Social Sciences in Australia (2017). She was an associate editor of the Academy of Management Journal and the Journal of Management, and served as the 2018–2019 president of the Academy of Management.

References

Living people
21st-century women scientists
21st-century Australian scientists
Australian psychologists
21st-century psychologists
Australian women social scientists
University of Illinois Urbana-Champaign alumni
Australian women psychologists
University of Illinois Urbana-Champaign faculty
Arizona State University faculty
Organizational psychologists
Academic staff of the University of Melbourne
Academic staff of the University of South Australia
Australian expatriates in the United States
Expatriate academics in the United States
Fellows of the Academy of the Social Sciences in Australia
Academic journal editors
Year of birth missing (living people)